Flavihumibacter petaseus is a Gram-negative and short rod-shaped bacterium from the genus of Flavihumibacter which has been isolated from greenhouse soil from Korea.

References

External links
Type strain of Flavihumibacter petaseus at BacDive -  the Bacterial Diversity Metadatabase

Chitinophagia
Bacteria described in 2010